Michael Roe (born 1995) is an English badminton player and a former national doubles champion.

Biography 
Roe became an English National doubles champion after winning the English National Badminton Championships men's doubles title with Matthew Clare in 2018.

He also won both the men's doubles and mixed doubles titles at the 2017 Welsh International.

Achievements

BWF International (2 titles, 1 runner-up) 

Men's doubles

Mixed doubles

  BWF International Challenge tournament
  BWF International Series tournament
  BWF Future Series tournament

References 

English male badminton players
1995 births
Living people